Beatriz Briones (born 10 February 1999) is a Mexican sprint kayaker. She won a medal in all four women's kayaking competitions at the 2019 Pan American Games held in Lima, Peru.

In 2015, she competed in the women's K-4 500 metres at the Pan American Games without winning a medal.

References

External links 
 

Living people
1999 births
Place of birth missing (living people)
Mexican female canoeists
Pan American Games medalists in canoeing
Pan American Games gold medalists for Mexico
Pan American Games silver medalists for Mexico
Pan American Games bronze medalists for Mexico
Medalists at the 2019 Pan American Games
Canoeists at the 2015 Pan American Games
Canoeists at the 2019 Pan American Games
Competitors at the 2018 Central American and Caribbean Games
Central American and Caribbean Games silver medalists for Mexico
Central American and Caribbean Games medalists in canoeing
20th-century Mexican women
21st-century Mexican women
ICF Canoe Sprint World Championships medalists in kayak